Sheila Betty Mercier (née Rix; 1 January 1919 – 4 December 2019) was an English actress, of stage and television, best known for playing Annie Sugden in the soap opera Emmerdale for over 20 years, from the programme's first episode in 1972 until the mid-1990s, with a guest return in 2009.

Early life and education
Mercier was born in Hull, East Riding of Yorkshire, England, the daughter of Herbert Rix (of J.R. Rix & Sons Ltd) and his wife Fanny. She was their third child and second daughter; her younger brother was the actor and campaigner Brian Rix. After education at the French Convent (Hull) and at Hunmanby Hall (both East Riding of Yorkshire), she trained for the stage at the Stratford-upon-Avon College of Drama under Randle Ayrton.

Career
Mercier had a long career on stage before her television career. Donald Wolfit had talent spotted her and she toured with Wolfit's own Shakespeare company in 1939. During the Second World War she joined the WAAF division of the Royal Air Force, serving in fighter command, eventually becoming adjutant. After the war, she worked in repertory theatre until 1951, receiving positive reviews from critics. One review said of her performance in The Enchanted Cottage in 1948, "Sheila Rix is outstanding as the witch-like housekeeper." In Noël Coward's Hay Fever at the Tonbridge Repertory Theatre the same year, a review said, "Sheila Rix superbly portrays the ex-actress, extremely emotional mother of the family." About Cocteau's The Eagle with Two Heads, another review said, "The number of repertory companies who have dealt with this striking play has been very small. Notable in the cast was Sheila Rix as the tragic Queen, who held her audience throughout."

From 1951 until 1972, she worked with her brother Brian Rix in the Whitehall farces, both at the Whitehall Theatre itself, on tour to regional theatres, and in televised performances on BBC Television. Critics commented, "Sheila Mercier ..[is] up to the second in tempo and sense of fun;" "In Chase Me, Comrade!, Jacqueline Ellis and Helen Jesson as well as Sheila Mercier, all contribute mightily to the fun with excellent work;" and "Sheila Mercier is refreshingly sane as the commander's wife." She also appeared in the television series Dial RIX (1963) alongside her husband, Peter Mercier.

In 1972, she was cast in the role she is best known for, the matriarch Annie Sugden, one of the principal characters in the new British soap opera Emmerdale Farm (later simply Emmerdale). She appeared as a main cast member until 1994 with rare occasional appearances later including the funeral for on-screen son Joe in June 1995, along with screen husband Amos Brearly. In 1979, Hazel Holt in The Stage wrote: "I never cease to admire the sheer consistency of Sheila Mercier's performance as Annie Sugden in Yorkshire's Emmerdale Farm. ... Every Tuesday and Friday, week in and week out she is never less than convincing." Mercier later reprised her role several times following the character's 1994 retirement.

Personal life and death
In 1951, Mercier married actor Peter Mercier. They were married for 42 years until his death in 1993. The couple's son, Nigel Mercier (6 December 1954 – 6 January 2017), also worked in the TV industry, initially with BBC Television News at Television Centre as a videotape editor and then at LWT. In 1994 Mercier's autobiography, Annie's Song: My Life & Emmerdale, written with Anthony Hayward, was published. In it, she disclosed that she had been raped by an officer early in the war, had become pregnant and given her baby daughter up for adoption, and had been contacted by her daughter thirty years later. The two women became close friends. Mercier's nephew is children's author, Jamie Rix, the son of her brother, Brian Rix. Mercier turned 100 on 1 January 2019 and died on 4 December 2019.

Filmography

Selected stage performances

Selected Whitehall farces

Selected filmography

References

External links

1919 births
2019 deaths
English centenarians
English film actresses
English memoirists
English soap opera actresses
English stage actresses
English television actresses
People from Hunmanby
British women in World War II
British women memoirists
Women centenarians
20th-century English actresses